The Admonter Reichenstein is a mountain in the Ennstal Alps and the highest and easternmost peak in the  Reichenstein Group. An ascent of the mountain requires climbing ability sufficient to handle UIAA grade II climbs.

Topography 
The Admonter Reichenstein has three summits. From west to east these are: the Admonter Horn 2,184 m, the Reichenstein main summit  and  the Totenköpfl 2,178 m. The Admonter Horn is separated from the main summit by the Reichenstein Saddle (Reichensteinsattel, 2,170 m). The Totenköpfl is separated from the main summit by the notch of the Reichensteinscharte 2,100 m. The mountain is surrounded on all sides by steep rock faces and drops. The Reichenstein is separated from the Sparafeld in the west by the wind gap of the Wildscharte 1,903 m.

External links 

Mountains of the Alps
Mountains of Styria
Two-thousanders of Austria
Ennstal Alps